Ludwigschorgast is a municipality in the district of Kulmbach in Bavaria in Germany.

Municipal parts

Ludwigschorgast is arranged in the following boroughs:

 Drahtmühle
 Erlenmühle
 Lindenhof
 Ludwigschorgast

References

Kulmbach (district)